Don't Be Cruel is the second studio album by American singer Bobby Brown. It was released in the United States on June 20, 1988 by MCA Records. MCA changed producers for this album and had Brown work with hit-making songwriting and production duo Babyface and L.A. Reid. Brown dedicated the album to his deceased best friend James "Jimbo" Flint who was stabbed to death when Brown was aged 11. Don't Be Cruel incorporates new jack swing, R&B, funk, dance and soul.

Don't Be Cruel peaked at number one on the US Billboard 200 and included five top 10 Billboard Hot 100 hits, with "My Prerogative" being a US number-one hit. Three of the singles also reached number one on Billboards Hot R&B Songs chart. "My Prerogative" was also the second-biggest single of 1989, ranking at number two on the Billboard Year-End Hot 100 singles of 1989. The album also spent a total of 11 non-consecutive weeks atop the Billboard R&B Albums chart over the course of 1988 and 1989. Internationally, it reached number one in Ireland and the top five in Australia, New Zealand, and the United Kingdom.

At the 32nd Grammy Awards, Brown won Best Male R&B Vocal Performance for "Every Little Step". Don't Be Cruel received extremely positive reviews from music critics. It was far more successful than Brown's debut album, spending a total of six weeks on top of the Billboard 200 and being the best-selling album of 1989 in the United States. On April 28, 1995 it was certified 7× Platinum by the Recording Industry Association of America (RIAA). The album sold over 12 million copies worldwide in total. In 2015, Billboard ranked Don't Be Cruel at number 82 on its list of the Greatest of All Time Billboard 200 Albums.

Development
Brown changed producers for this album, and worked extensively with hit-making songwriting and production duo Babyface and L.A. Reid. Alex Henderson of AllMusic writes:

Singles
All five singles released from the album reached the top 10 of the Billboard Hot 100. "Don't Be Cruel" was released as the lead single. The second single, "My Prerogative", earned Brown his first number one on the Billboard Hot 100. "My Prerogative" was also the second-biggest single of 1989, finishing at number two on the Year-End Billboard Hot 100 Singles of 1989. Three of the singles also reached number one on Billboards Hot R&B Songs chart.

All singles except "Roni" were certified Gold by the RIAA.

Commercial performance
Don't Be Cruel debuted at number 74 on the Billboard 200 on July 23, 1988. It wasn't until six months later that the album reached number one, starting a six-week non-consecutive run at number one, from January 21, 1989 – February 4, 1989 and February 18, 1989 – March 4, 1989. Its reign at number one was interrupted for one week by Guns N' Roses' Appetite for Destruction.

The album also spent a total of 11 non-consecutive weeks atop the Billboard R&B/Hip-Hop Albums chart over the course of 1988 and 1989. It spent an eight-week non-consecutive run at number one from September–November 1988, and then returned to number one four months later in March 1989.

Don't Be Cruel was the best-selling album of 1989 in the United States, and finished number one on the Billboard Year-End album chart. Eventually the album sold 12 million copies worldwide in less than a decade.

Track listing

Personnel 
Credits adapted from AllMusic.

 Richard Aguon – drum fills (8), drums (8,9), background vocals (8, 9)
 Babyface – mixing (1, 2, 4-6, 11), producer (1, 2, 4-6, 11), background vocals (2, 4-6)
 Bernard Belle – background vocals (2, 7)
 Ollie Bolds – background vocals (8, 9)
 Bobby Brown – primary artist, producer (3, 7, 10), background vocals (all tracks)
 Tommy Brown – finger snaps (8), production coordination
 Emilio Conesa – guitar (8)
 Kirk Crumpler – bass (8), synthesizer (8), synthesizer bass (8)
 Michael Denten – drum technician (8), engineer (8,9), mixing (8,9), background vocals (8, 9)
 Lee Drakeford – background vocals (2, 7)
 Don Emerson – assistant engineer (1, 2 4-6, 11)
 Jon Gass – engineer (6), mixing, special edits (1, 2, 4-6, 11)
 Mitch Gibson – engineer (10)
 Todd Gray – photography
 Toni Greene – assistant engineer (1, 2, 4-6, 11)
 Gene Griffin – producer (3, 7)
 Portia Griffin – background vocals (10)
 John Guggenheim – assistant engineer (1, 2, 4-6, 11)
 Aaron Hall – background vocals (3, 7)
 Steve Hall – mastering
 Fred Howard – assistant engineer (1, 2, 4-6, 11)
 Ja – art direction
 Howard Johnston – engineer (8, 9)
 Gordon Jones – multi instruments (10), producer (10), background vocals (10)
 K2 – assistant engineer  (8, 9)
 Kayo – guest artist, background vocals (2, 4, 6)
 Ruben Laxamana – engineer (8), special effects (8)
 Melecio Magdaluyo – soprano saxophone (8)
 Dennis Mitchell – engineer (2, 7), mixing  (2, 7)
 Julie Moss – design
 Lee Peters – background vocals  (8, 9)
 Ben Reyes – keyboards (8, 9)
 L.A. Reid – producer (1, 2, 4-6, 11)
 Markell Riley – drum programming (3, 7)
 Teddy Riley – keyboards (3, 7), mixing (3, 7), background vocals (3, 7)
 Percy Scott – keyboards (8, 9)
 Louil Silas, Jr. – executive producer, remixing (9)
 Daryl Simmons – background vocals (2, 4-6)
 Mark Slagle – assistant engineer (8, 9)
 Dewayne Sweet – drums (8), keyboards (8, 9), synthesizer, synthesizer bass (8,9)
 Ralph Tresvant – background vocals 
 Ronnie Watkins – background vocals (8)
 Karyn White –  guest artist, background vocals (2, 4, 6)
 Larry White – Larry White – assistant engineer (8, 9), bass (8), drums (8), guitar (8), keyboards (8, 9), mixing (8, 9), producer (8, 9), background vocals (8)

Charts

Weekly charts

Singles

Year-end charts

Certifications

References

See also
List of number-one R&B albums of 1988 (U.S.)
List of number-one R&B albums of 1989 (U.S.)
List of number-one albums of 1989 (U.S.)
Billboard Year-End

1988 albums
Bobby Brown albums
MCA Records albums
Albums produced by L.A. Reid
Albums produced by Babyface (musician)